The iridescent toothcarp (Aphanius mento) is a species of killifish. It can be found in Western Asia (Iraq, Israel, Jordan, Lebanon, Palestine, Syria and Turkey). It occurs in a wide range of freshwater habitats (springs, streams, lakes and rivers). It grows to  total length. This species was described in 1843 as Lebias mento by Johann Jakob Heckel with the type locality given as Mosul in Iraq.

References

Aphanius
Freshwater fish of Western Asia
Fauna of Iraq
Fish of Israel
Fauna of Jordan
Fauna of Palestine (region)
Fauna of Lebanon
Fauna of Syria
Fish of Turkey
Fish described in 1843
Taxa named by Johann Jakob Heckel